Peter Gordon Blyth Buchanan (born 14 February 1938) is a Scottish retired amateur footballer who made over 200 appearances as a centre forward in the Scottish League for Queen's Park. He later served on the club's committee and as president. He is Scotland's joint-top scorer at amateur level and made two 1964 Summer Olympic qualifying appearances for Great Britain.

Honours 
Scotland Amateurs
 FA Centenary Amateur International Tournament

References 

Scottish footballers
Scottish Football League players
Association football forwards
Queen's Park F.C. players
Living people
1938 births
Queen's Park F.C. non-playing staff
Pollok F.C. players
Scotland amateur international footballers